Mohamed Khadheri (born 11 July 1987) is a retired Tunisian football defender.

References

1987 births
Living people
Tunisian footballers
CS Hammam-Lif players
CA Bizertin players
EGS Gafsa players
ES Métlaoui players
Association football defenders
Tunisian Ligue Professionnelle 1 players